The Speaker of the Legislative Assembly of Saskatchewan is the presiding officer of the Saskatchewan Legislature.

Speakers of the Legislative Assembly of Saskatchewan
Thomas MacNutt 1906–1908
William Charles Sutherland 1908–1912
John Albert Sheppard 1912–1916
Robert Menzies Mitchell 1917–1919
George Adam Scott 1919–1925
Walter George Robinson 1925–1929
James Fraser Bryant 1929
Robert Sterritt Leslie 1930–1934
John Mason Parker 1934–1938
Charles Agar 1939–1944
Tom Johnston 1944–1956
James Andrew Darling 1957–1960
Everett Irvine Wood 1961
Frederick Arthur Dewhurst 1962–1964
James Snedker 1965–1971
Frederick Arthur Dewhurst 1971–1975
John Edward Brockelbank 1975–1982
Herbert Swan 1982–1986
Arnold Bernard Tusa 1986–1991
Herman Harold Rolfes 1991–1996
Glenn Hagel 1996–1999
Ron Osika 1999–2001
P. Myron Kowalsky 2001–2007
Don Toth 2007–2011
Daniel H. D'Autremont 2011–2016
Corey Tochor 2016–2018
Mark Docherty 2018-2020
Randy Weekes 2020–present

See also
Speaker (politics)

References 
 

Politics of Saskatchewan
Saskatchewan